There are many fictional Elves appearing in American comic books published by Marvel Comics. The most common of the Elves are the Dark Elves of Svartalfheim and the Light Elves of Alfheim that are based on the elves of Norse mythology. They frequently appear in stories featuring the superhero Thor.

The Dark Elves appeared in the 2013 Marvel Studios film Thor: The Dark World and a Light Elf appeared in the 2022 series She-Hulk: Attorney at Law.

Publication history
Bright-Elves first appeared in Thor #277 (Nov. 1978) and were created by Roy Thomas, John Buscema and Tom Palmer. None of the small crowd of Bright-Elves who appear in that issue are named.

Dark Elves first appeared in Thor #344 (June 1984) and were originally created by Walt Simonson. The only Dark Elf to appear in that first issue was Malekith the Accursed. Algrim the Strong / Kurse and Wormwood later appeared in Thor #347 (Sept. 1984), once again created by Walt Simonson. Grendell and Bitterhand appeared  in Thor #377 (March 1987), and were created by Walt Simonson and Sal Buscema. Alflyse first appeared in Incredible Hercules #129 (Oct. 2009), and was created by Greg Pak, Fred Van Lente, and Reilly Brown.

Light Elves first appeared in Alpha Flight #50 (Sept. 1987) and were created by Bill Mantlo and June Brigman. The Light Elf Aeltri and her son Hrinmeer the Flame first appeared in Thor Annual #18 (Dec. 1993), and were created by Ron Marz and Tom Grindberg. A few subspecies of Light Elves have also been introduced.

Cat Elves first appeared in Alpha Flight #81 (Feb. 1990), and were created by James Hudnall and John Calimee. Ice Elves first appeared in Thor #615 (Nov. 2010), and were created by Matt Fraction and Pasqual Ferry.

Fictional history

Elves of Asgard

Dark-Elves
The Dark Elves are ruled over by Malekith the Accursed, and the most powerful amongst their ranks was Algrim the Strong. However, Algrim was betrayed by Malekith in a bid to kill Thor. Algrim was dropped into lava and though he survived, he was critically wounded. The Beyonder transformed Algrim into the monstrous Kurse, who seemingly kills Malekith for the betrayal. Years later, Malekith reveals that he survived, and he sets forth an ultimately unsuccessful plot for Hercules to kill Alflyse, the Dark Elf Queen of the Eastern Spires.

The trio of Bitterhand, Wormwood, and Grendell serve Malekith loyally and have attempted to destroy Thor on several occasions, including once while Mjolnir was being reforged.

Bright-Elves
The Bright-Elves first appeared in Thor when mortal cameraman 
Roger "Red" Norvell (who had acquired the powers of Thor) carries the goddess Sif away to "a world far distant in time and sub-space" from Asgard. Once there, the duo are soon greeted by a crowd of humanoids who introduce themselves as the Ljos-Alfar (or Bright-Elves) and welcome the outsiders to their home, Alfheim. The aggressive Red responds by claiming their land as his and knocks the entire welcoming party off their feet with his hammer. These Elves are somewhat shorter than Asgardians (like Sif) and have large pointed ears.

Light-Elves
The Light Elves first appear in Alpha Flight when Loki lies to an ill and delusional Northstar and claims Northstar is one of them. This prompts Northstar to journey to Alfheim to reside there and abandon the rest of Alpha Flight.

Cat-Elves
A subspecies of the Light Elves called the Cat Elves are introduced when Northstar learns he has been deceived by Loki. These Elves are smaller than their brethren and ride winged cats as their steed.

Ice-Elves
Another subspecies of the Light Elves called the Ice Elves were revealed when one of their palaces was wiped out by the Ano-Athox warlord Uthana Thoth. The Ice Elves reside in the frozen portion of Alfheim.

Santa's Elves 
These magical Elves are descendants of the Light Elves and aid Santa Claus, a powerful mutant, in creating toys for Santa to deliver and they are resistant to aging and diseases.

Smoke-Elves
During the "'Fear Itself" storyline, the Smoke Elves debut where they are the servants of the Serpent. They created a Golem that attacked Iron Man and the Dwarves in Svartalfheim. The Golem that the Smoke Elves created was defeated by Iron Man. While Iron Man prepares to take the Asgardian weapons to his allies, Splitlip and his Dwarves are given the approval to have Iron Man dispose of the captive Smoke Elves. Iron Man then gives the Smoke Elves the choice of either being dealt with by the Dwarves or taking their leave. The Smoke Elves choose to take their leave.

Elves of Klarn
The Elves of Klarn are a race of Elves that reside on the floating Weirdworld island of Klarn. There was also a group of Savage Elves descended from the Elves of Klarn that weren't on Klarn when it was flung into the sky by the sorcerer Darklens.

During the Secret Wars storyline, the Elves of Klarn and the Savage Elves ended up on the Battleworld version of Weirdworld when their Weirdworld was merged with the other alternate reality magical realms. The Savage Elves helped to fight the forces of Morgan le Fay until Battleworld fell apart and Weirdworld appeared on Earth in the Bermuda Triangle.

As part of the "All-New, All-Different Marvel" branding, the Elves of Klarn ended up under the mind-control of Doctor Druid when he gained a corporal form when his spirit arrived on Weirdworld.

Powers and abilities
Dark elves possess gifted intellects, as well as superhuman strength, speed, stamina, durability, agility, and reflexes. They also all possess a vulnerability to iron.

Light elves also possess superhuman strength, speed, stamina, durability, agility, and reflexes. Additionally, they have a penchant for archery.

Known Elves of Asgard

Known Light Elves
 Aelsa – Queen of Alfheim and of the Light Elves
 Aeltri – a Light Elf who was kidnapped and raped by a Fire Demon and gave birth to Hrinmeer
 Ayelah – representative for Alfheim on the Congress of Worlds
 Faradei – a Light Elf warrior who helped Thor
 Hrinmeer the Flame – a Light Elf and Fire Demon hybrid, he was killed during Ragnarok
 Ivory – Lord of Longrose Hall
 Milkmane – a senator who represented the Light Elves of Alfheim on the Congress of Worlds
 Peaseblossom – a delegate who negotiated a safe passage for Asgardia with the All-Mother

Known Dark Elves
 Alflyse – Queen of Svartalfheim, she was killed by Malekith
 Bitterhand – a servant of Malekith, he was killed by Freyja during the War of the Realms
 Canker – the herald for the Council of the Unhallowed
 Grendell – a half Dark Elf  and son of "Big Mother", he was killed by Beowulf
 Gutbeard Brothers – warriors loyal to Malekith, they were killed by Thor
 Jagrfelm – a physically deformed elf, he was a master weaponsmith and was killed by Malekith
 Kurse (Algrim) –
 Kraw – King of the Dark Elf, he waged war against the Trolls, Light Elves, Dwarves and Asgardians, but was replaced by Malekith
 Mageth – an Empathic Dark Elf, she aided Steve Rogers
 Malekith the Accursed – 
 Mazerot – mother of Malekith, she was fed to her own War Dogs by her son due for her wrongdoing
 Mirka – a warrior priestess from Svartalfheim, and a member of the E.R.F.E.I. all-stars basketball team
 Rotjaw – a warrior loyal to Malekith, he was killed by Thor's goat
 Scumtounge – a warrior loyal to Malekith and Senator at the Congress of Worlds
 Snaggi – a Dark Elf and Giant hybrid, under the order of Malekith, she went after Iron Man, but was defeated
 Sourfoot – a warrior loyal to Malekith, he sacrificed his owm wellbeing in order to help Malekith escape and was then mercy killed by Malekith
 Swarmsuckle – a member of Queen Alflyse's court, he was killed by Malekith and his men
 Terrana – a hunter, under the order of Malekith, she went after Iron Man and also retrieved the Bride's offspring
 Waziria – a Dark Elf witch and former League of Realms member who was later transformed into the second Kurse.
 Wormsong – a knight loyal to Queen Alflyse, he was killed by Malekith and his men
 Wormwood – 
 Xan – a philosopher warrior, under the order of Malekith, he went after Iron Man, but was defeated. He was killed by Malekith for his defeat

Elves of Klarn
 Tyndall – an elf dragonmaster who befriends Velanna
 Velanna – a female blonde elf that Tyndall befriends

Elves of Otherworld
 Moondog – was an lupine like Elf, one of the race of Elves originally native to both Britain and Otherworld. He alongside Captain Britain, Black Knight and Vortigen went to Otherworld in order to fight against Mordred and Necromon, but would be killed in the fight.
 Sundog – uncle of Moondog.
 Jackdaw – a sidekick of Captain Britain, he was slain by Fury.

In other media

Television
 The Elves appear in The Avengers: Earth's Mightiest Heroes:
 Malekith the Accursed of the Dark Elves appeared in "The Casket of Ancient Winters", voiced by Quinton Flynn. During the events of "The Fall of Asgard", Black Panther had fought Dark Elf souls while in Asgard.
 Faradei of the Light Elves appeared in "The Fall of Asgard", voiced by Troy Baker. He fights alongside Hawkeye and Black Panther against a pack of wolves.

 The Dark Elves appear in the Hulk and the Agents of S.M.A.S.H. episode "For Asgard". Malekith the Accursed leads the Dark Elves in a plot to take over Asgard where they ended up fighting Thor, Heimdall, the Warriors Three, and the Agents of S.M.A.S.H. at the time when Odin was away on a peace mission.
 The Light Elves appear in the Christmas TV special Marvel Super Hero Adventures: Frost Fight!. A bunch of Light Elves live in the polar parts of Alfheim where they protect the property of Jolnir, who is known on Earth as Santa Claus and is the son of a female Light Elf and a male Frost Giant.

Films
 Algrim of the Dark Elves appears in the animated film Thor: Tales of Asgard. He is seen as an advisor to Odin and his kind was driven to near-extinction by the Frost Giants.

Marvel Cinematic Universe
 The Elves appear in the Marvel Cinematic Universe:
 The Dark Elves appear in Thor: The Dark World, with Malekith portrayed by Christopher Eccleston and Algrim/Kurse portrayed by Adewale Akinnuoye-Agbaje. The Dark Elves, as with their enemies the Asgardians, are depicted as ancient astronauts. In the film, it is stated they existed in the endless night of dark matter and dark energy that predated the universe. Their goal is to destroy the current universe and return existence back to the primordial darkness from whence it came. They were believed extinct after the Asgardians stopped an attempt to do that five thousand years ago. Unbeknownst to the Asgardians, Malekith and a number of warriors escaped and went into stasis in deep space until another attempt would be possible. For the film, David J. Peterson created a language for the Dark Elves called Shiväisith.
 In Guardians of the Galaxy, an imprisoned Dark Elf appears as an exhibit in Taneleer Tivan's museum.
 In Spider-Man: Homecoming, Dark Elf technology that was salvaged from the Battle of Greenwich was used by Tinkerer alongside the technologies from the Chitauri and Stark Industries.
 The She-Hulk: Attorney at Law episode "The People vs. Emil Blonsky" features a shapeshifing Light Elf named Runa (portrayed by Peg O'Keif) who is being sued by Dennis Bukowski for impersonating Megan Thee Stallion. Thanks to Jennifer Walters' testimony, Judge Price found in favor of Bukowski and sentenced Runa to 60 days for impersonating him.

Video games
 The Dark Elves appear as enemies in Marvel: Ultimate Alliance.
 The Dark Elves appear in Marvel: Avengers Alliance. They appear in the 14th Spec-Ops that revolved around Thor: The Dark World.
 The Dark Elves appear as enemies in Marvel Heroes. They were released as part of the Asgard event to tie in with the release of Thor: The Dark World.

References

External links 
 

Characters created by Walt Simonson
Fictional elves
Marvel Comics characters with superhuman strength